Arthur Usherwood (1884 – 1961) was an English footballer who played in the Football League for Stoke.

Career
Usherwood played amateur football with Congleton Excelsior before moving to Stoke in 1904. He played six times for Stoke during the 1904–05 season scoring once in a 4–0 win over Blackburn Rovers in January 1905. At the end of the season he returned to amateur football with Ashton Town.

Career statistics

References

English footballers
Stoke City F.C. players
English Football League players
1884 births
People from Congleton
1961 deaths
Ashton Town A.F.C. players
Sportspeople from Cheshire
Association football forwards